Chung Jung-yeon (born 4 July 1987, Gyeongsangbuk) is a South Korean judoka who competes in the women's 48 kg category. At the 2012 Summer Olympics, she was defeated in the second round.

References

External links
 
 

1987 births
Living people
People from North Gyeongsang Province
Sportspeople from North Gyeongsang Province
Olympic judoka of South Korea
Judoka at the 2012 Summer Olympics
Asian Games medalists in judo
Judoka at the 2010 Asian Games
South Korean female judoka
Universiade medalists in judo
Medalists at the 2010 Asian Games
Asian Games bronze medalists for South Korea
Universiade silver medalists for South Korea
Universiade bronze medalists for South Korea
21st-century South Korean women